The Zaisan Memorial is a memorial in the southern area of the Mongolian capital of Ulaanbaatar in the duureg (district) of Khan-Uul that honors allied Mongolian and Soviet soldiers killed in World War II.  Located on a hill in the southern part of the city, the  memorial features a circular memorial painting that depicts scenes of friendship between the people of the USSR and Mongolia. The mural depicts scenes such as Soviet support for Mongolia's independence declaration in 1921, the defeat of the Japanese Kwantung Army by the Soviets at Khalhkin Gol on the Mongolian border in 1939, victory over Nazi Germany and peacetime achievements such as Soviet space flights including the flight of Soyuz 39 which carried the first Mongolian into space, Jugderdemidiin Gurragchaa.

After driving to the uppermost parking lot on the hill, visitors must make a climb of three hundred steps before reaching the monument and mural. (612 steps, if they start at the base of the hill.)  Those who make the climb are rewarded with a panoramic view of the entire city of Ulaanbaatar in the valley below, as well as the Tuul River flowing past the city.

In 2003, a tank memorial, which previously had been located on a crossroads between Zaisan and the city center, was moved to the foot of the hill. It features a Soviet tank from a brigade paid for by the Mongolian people. The tank memorial includes a map showing the route the brigade took from Moscow in 1943 to its participation in the fall of Berlin in 1945.

Zaisan is a popular meeting point for school outings and graduation festivities. In recent times, more and more modern luxury housing developments have popped up near the Zaisan region, making it popular as an elite residential district.

See also
 Mongolia in World War II

References

External links
 Large photo of the Zaisan Memorial

Monuments and memorials in Mongolia
Buildings and structures in Ulaanbaatar
Mongolia–Soviet Union relations